The 2022 K League 1, also known as the Hana 1Q K League 1 for sponsorship reasons, is the 40th season of the top division of professional football in South Korea since its establishment in 1983 as the K League, and the fifth season under its current name, the K League 1. Jeonbuk Hyundai Motors are the defending champions.

The 2022 season will be divided into two parts. First, there will be 33 Regular Rounds in which 12 teams play a round robin with 3 rounds (Rounds 1–33). Then there will be a Final A and Final B, each with 6 teams divided based on regular round performance, with each final being a round robin (Rounds 34–38).

Promotion and relegation
Teams relegated to the 2022 K League 2
 Gwangju FC

Teams promoted from the 2021 K League 2
 Gimcheon Sangmu

Participating teams by province
The following twelve clubs will compete in the K League 1 during the 2022 season.

Stadiums

Foreign players
Restricting the number of foreign players strictly to five per team, including a slot for a player from the Asian Football Confederation countries and a slot for a player from the Association of Southeast Asian Nations. Gimcheon Sangmu FC, being a military-owned team, is not allowed to sign any foreign players. A team could use five foreign players on the field each game, including at least one player from the AFC confederation.  An Byong-jun, playing for Suwon Samsung Bluewings, was deemed to be a native player. 
The name in bold indicates that the player was registered during the mid-season transfer window.

League table

Positions by matchday

Round 1–33

Round 34–38

Fixtures and results

Matches 1–22 
Teams play each other twice, once at home, once away.

Matches 23–33 
Teams will play each other once.

Final Round Matches 34–38 
Teams will play each other once.
 

Final A

Final B

Relegation play-offs
The Promotion-relegation playoffs will be contested between the 2nd placed team in the K League 2 playoff and the 11th placed team in the K League 1, and between the winners of K League 2 playoff and the 10th placed team in the K League 1. The winners will secure a place in the 2023 K League 1.

First leg

Second leg

Suwon Samsung Bluewings won 2–1 on aggregate and retained their K League 1 spot. Anyang remained in K League 2.

Daejeon Hana Citizen won 6–1 on aggregate and was promoted to K League 1. Gimcheon Sangmu was relegated to K League 2.

Season statistics

Goals

Assists

Awards

Most Valuable Player of the Round

Monthly Awards

Season Awards 

The 2022 K League Awards was held on 24 October 2022.

K League Most Valuable Player

The K League Most Valuable Player award was won by  Lee Chung-yong (Ulsan Hyundai).

K League Young Player

The K League Young Player award was won by  Yang Hyun-jun (Gangwon FC).

K League Top Scorer

The K League Top Scorer award was won by  Cho Gue-sung (Gimcheon Sangmu, Jeonbuk Hyundai Motors).

K League Top Assistor

The K League Top Assistor award was won by  Lee Ki-je (Suwon Samsung Bluewings).

K League Best XI

K League Manager of the Year
The K League Manager of the Year award was won by Hong Myung-bo of Ulsan Hyundai.

Notes

See also
 2022 K League 2

References

K League 1 seasons
South Korea
2022 in South Korean football